"Alguien Más" is the fourth single from Belinda's second studio album Utopía.

Background 
The song was released to radio in September 2007, but it was less successful than her previous single, "Luz Sin Gravedad".

To choose the fourth single, Belinda did a survey to her fans, which won "Alguien Más", followed by "Never Enough", "Amiga Soledad", "Pudo Ser Tan Fácil" and "Good... Good". Unlike the first three singles, "Alguien Más" doesn't have an English version.

Composition 
The single was written by Belinda, Nacho Peregín, Kara DioGuardi and Mitch Allan, who also produced the song. The song is about a girl whose boyfriend is not acting the same; she feels there is some other girl (someone else) that he is seeing.

Track list 
Digital download/Promo
 Alguien Más – 3:13

Music video 
According to the official Belinda's site, the artist filmed the music video in late July 2007, where she was the producer and guionist. It was to be released but the video was cancelled for unknown reasons. But even though the song was not promoted with a video, it entered the top 100 of the Mexican and Chilean Charts.

References 

2006 songs
Belinda Peregrín songs
Songs written by Kara DioGuardi
Pop ballads
Songs written by Mitch Allan
Songs written by Nacho Peregrín
Songs written by Belinda Peregrín
Song recordings produced by Mitch Allan